Reston  is an unincorporated community in Gadsden County, Florida, United States. It includes more than 100 homes. Development is guided by the Homeowners' Association of Reston, Inc.

References
City-Data.com
RestonHomeOwners.com

Unincorporated communities in Gadsden County, Florida
Tallahassee metropolitan area
Unincorporated communities in Florida